Life imprisonment in Mexico is theoretically legal, but as of 2001, the Mexican Supreme Court stated that all persons sentenced to life imprisonment or a lengthy prison term (such as 300 years in prison) must become eligible for parole after one has served 50 years. If an offender has maintained good behavior, they become paroled after 40 years. In certain cases, offenders can be paroled after serving 60 years. Mexico does not extradite any prisoner subjected to capital punishment.

See also
 Law of Mexico

References

Law of Mexico